"My Heart Belongs to Daddy" is a song written by Cole Porter, for the 1938 musical Leave It to Me! which premiered on November 9, 1938.  It was originally performed by Mary Martin, who played Dolly Winslow, the young "protégée" of a rich newspaper publisher.

In the original context, Dolly is stranded at a Siberian railway station, wearing only a fur coat, and performs a striptease while singing the song. Surrounded by eager Siberian men, she says that since she has met "daddy", she will flirt with other men, but won't "follow through". "Daddy" is her sugar daddy, a newspaper magnate introduced with the words, "I've come to care, for such a sweet millionaire".

Later versions
Martin sang it again in the 1940 movie Love Thy Neighbor.  Again she wears a fur coat, but the setting is a show within a show and the act is more conventional as she wears an evening gown beneath the fur. The words to the introduction are altered, the innuendoes being toned down. Her best-known movie performance is in the 1946 Cole Porter biopic Night and Day in which she plays herself.  The film recreates Martin's audition then segues into her performance in the original Siberian context. She again performs the striptease, discarding her muff and then the fur coat, while mustachioed Siberian men follow her every move, eventually fainting when she removes her coat to reveal a skimpy figure-hugging costume beneath.

In Britain, the song was a hit for Pat Kirkwood who performed it in the 1938 revue Black Velvet. This led to her being dubbed "Britain's first wartime star". The song was thereafter associated with her.

Marilyn Monroe sings the song in the film Let's Make Love (1960). The introduction is completely changed. She introduces herself as "Lolita", who is not allowed to "play with boys". A verse is added in which she invites a boy "to cook up a fine enchilada". The lines do not conform to the rhyme scheme of the rest of the song, but have been used by many other performers since. Anna Nicole Smith recorded a copy of the Monroe version in 1997, it was released in CD-single and 12 maxi with two versions.

Lyrical and musical features
Rhyming with "daddy" is difficult but Porter characteristically managed it well.  One clever rhyme is   
Finnan haddie is smoked fish, and this is one of many innuendoes which appear throughout the song. Sophie Tucker famously advised Mary Martin to deliver such sexy lines while looking towards heaven.  Mary Martin's stage persona was quite innocent and so the contrast between her naive manner and the suggestive lyrics accompanied by her delivery (in one recording she inserts a significant pause in the middle of the word 'asking' in the above-quoted lyric) and the provocative striptease made her performance a huge success. Brooks Atkinson, the critic of the New York Times, wrote that Martin's "mock innocence makes My Heart Belongs to Daddy the bawdy ballad of the season".

The original version contains four verses, all of which play on idiosyncratic rhymes with "daddy". The first refers to a game of golf during which she might "make a play for the caddy". The second is about the finnan haddie. The third tells of wearing green with a "Paddy" on St Patrick's day. The final verse is about a varsity football match where one might meet a "strong under-graddy". In the original version, she ends up saying that her daddy might "spank" her if she was "bad".

Referring to the melody, especially the passage of "da da da da"s, Oscar Levant described it as "one of the most Yiddish tunes ever written" despite the fact that "Cole Porter's  background was not Jewish."  Lyrics critic Philip Furia replied that the essence of that bit of melody is to suggest that "Daddy" is Jewish.

Notable recordings
The 1938 version by bandleader Larry Clinton with singer Bea Wain was the most successful of the many contemporary recordings, entering the U.S. charts at the same time as Mary Martin's original cast recording but peaking at No. 4, compared to Martin's No. 7.
The Count Basie Orchestra (1939) with Helen Humes on Decca
Valaida Snow(1939)
Eartha KittThat Bad Eartha (1953)
Peggy LeeBlack Coffee (1953)
Kitty KallenLittle Things Mean A Lot (1954)
Ella FitzgeraldSongs in a Mellow Mood (1954)
Dorothy Dandridge – CBS's “Ford Star Jubilee's tribute to Cole Porter" (1956) 
Pat Suzuki on her album Miss Pony Tail (1957).
Anita O'DayCool Heat (1959)
Dizzy GillespieHave Trumpet, Will Excite! (1959)
Della ReeseDella Della Cha Cha Cha (1960) 
Marilyn MonroeLet's Make Love (1960).  During her performance she wears a purple sweater over a black bodystocking.  Near the end of the song, she takes off her sweater, revealing her bodystocking and a black bikini over it.
Oscar PetersonNight Train (1962)
Julie LondonAll Through the Night: Julie London Sings the Choicest of Cole Porter (1965)
Herb Alpert and the Tijuana BrassHerb Alpert's Ninth (1967)
Violetta VillasVioletta Villas sings (1970)
Ella FitzgeraldElla Loves Cole (1972)
Anna Nicole SmithMy Heart Belongs To Daddy (1997)
Dee Dee BridgewaterDear Ella (1997)
Paul MotianOn Broadway Vol.1 (2003)
Sophie MilmanSophie Milman (2004)
Stacey Kent and Jim TomlinsonThe Lyric (2005)
Portland, Oregon-based jazz singer Barbara Lusch performed the song on her 2006 release Surprisingly Good for You
Jinkx MonsoonThe Inevitable Album (2014)
Ariana Grande recorded a cover of the song to be used in an interlude for her Sweetener World Tour

Notes

Songs written by Cole Porter
1938 songs
1939 singles
Marilyn Monroe songs
Songs from Cole Porter musicals